Thomas A. Rich (April 26, 1916 – November 14, 2011) was an American professional basketball player. He played for the Rochester Royals in the National Basketball League during the 1945–46 season and averaged 2.6 points per game. He also competed in independent leagues in the Syracuse, New York area.

In college, Rich earned varsity letters playing for the soccer, basketball, and baseball teams at Cornell University. He was a member of the Quill and Dagger society and inducted into the Cornell Athletic Hall of Fame. After his Cornell career was over, Rich was hired as an engineer at Seagram's, then in 1943 started working for P&C Food Markets in Syracuse. He retired as president of the company in 1974.

References

1916 births
2011 deaths
American men's basketball players
Baseball players from Syracuse, New York
Basketball players from Syracuse, New York
Cornell Big Red baseball players
Cornell Big Red men's basketball players
Cornell Big Red men's soccer players
Forwards (basketball)
People from Hobart, New York
Rochester Royals players
Soccer players from New York (state)
Association footballers not categorized by position
Association football players not categorized by nationality